Robert Sean Millner Morris is a former English first-class cricketer. Born in 1968 in Buckinghamshire, he was educated at Stowe School and Durham University, where he graduated with a degree in sociology and captained the cricket and hockey teams. 

Morris had trials with Nottinghamshire and Worcestershire before joining Hampshire. He played 37 first-class matches as a right-handed opening batsman, enjoying his best season in 1994 when he averaged 49 and scored a career best 174 against Nottinghamshire. Unable to secure a regular place in the Hampshire line-up, Morris was released in 1996, his final innings a century against Cambridge University.

He became the chief executive of the Professional Cricketers' Association in 2008. Morris left that role in 2009 to become the chief executive of the Rajasthan Royals in the Indian Premier League.

External links
Sean Morris on Cricinfo
Sean Morris on CricketArchive
Matches and detailed statistics for Sean Morris

References

1968 births
Living people
People from Buckinghamshire
English cricketers
Hampshire cricketers
English cricket administrators
British chief executives
Alumni of the College of St Hild and St Bede, Durham
People educated at Stowe School